Urban Planning in China or The People's Republic of China is currently characterized by a top-down approach, high density urban development and extensive urbanization. China's urban planning philosophies and practices have undergone multiple transitions due to governance and economic structure changes throughout the nation's extensive history. The founding of the People's Republic of China in 1949 marks the beginning of three recent historical stages of urban planning philosophies and practice that represent a divergence from traditional Chinese urban planning morphologies are broadly categorized as socialist, hybrid and global cities.

Traditional City - walled cities, for example, Xi'an and Beijing's Forbidden City.  Traditional cities, were planned in a manner similar to that of present-day, was they were also directly affected by the philosophies, governance and economies of their time.  Traditional cities are often planned in accordance with archaic concepts of geomancy, Feng-shui, I-Ching.  The Rites of Zhou dating to approximately (1100–256 BC) serve to emphasize the importance of such philosophies, the cardinal directions and harmony between the human and natural realms. China's history is rich with examples of early planning philosophies and practices evidenced by traditional cities such as, but not limited to Chang'an (Xi'an), Beijing, Nanjing and Luoyang.
Socialist City - (1950–1980) Planning efforts focused to increase the percentage of blue-collar workers, create affordable housing, urban communes, work unit (danwei ), discrete enclosures, broad, central avenues and large squares and Soviet-style exhibition halls. Examples include: Harbin and Beijing.
Hybrid City - (1860–Present) Planning that incorporating western planning and design principles meshed with traditional Chinese street grids and architectural principles. These were often the first cities to develop modern infrastructures networks and include cities such as Shanghai and Tianjin.
Global City - (1990–Present) Planning aimed to encourage strategic economic development of a region for the purposes of global economic participation as a key node in the globalized market; coined and conceptualized by Saskia Sassen.  Global cities are characterized by international familiarity, participation in international events and global affairs, densely populated metropolitan areas, Central Business Districts (CBD) housing key financial, corporate headquarters and national services, extensive public transportation systems, internationally networked airports, large-scale commercial and industrial zones and multiple urban cores. Examples include Beijing, Shanghai, Hong Kong, Guangzhou and more recently Shenzhen.

History

China provides one of many examples of how archaic philosophies and their resulting planning decisions have had a profound impact on not only the spatial organization, but the culture of cities and nations of the distant past and present. Planning in China originates previous to that of the very early dynastic times, for example, "the most influential study of an ideal layout for a royal capital" was recorded in the Kaogongji (Artificers' Record) during the Western Han dynasty (206 BC-9 AD) and is thought to have been a replacement for a lost section of the Rites of Zhou created during the Zhou dynasty (1100-256BC). Further, the Rites of Zhou indicate that the origins of the most basic of urban planning philosophies in China are of a more archaic nature relating to concepts of geomancy, Feng Shui and I Ching. The planners of ancient China "imposed an orthogonal and cardinal regimen on the districts, temples, places and streets of its capital cities at least as early as the Zhou dynasty (1122-221 B.C.)" and that the Rites of Zhou confirm the importance cosmologically based philosophies such as directional orientation and symmetry.  Santiago Ortuzar indicates that such basic rural and urban planning philosophies may have originated more than 7000 years ago in the Neolithic villages, for example, the Hemudu culture settlements in Zhejiang province. Banpo, a village outside of Xi'an dating to 4500 or 3000 B.C. provides an example of early urban activity centres as 45 dwellings still remain in what could be easily considered high density for the building materials of the time. The traditional walled cities, such as Xi'an were planned in 7th century AD as the first Chinese capital city under the Sui dynasty. The construction of which was preceded by a regional survey to ensure the flow of water, resources and a strategic location for reasons of health, natural balance and safety; an exercise planners today practice on a daily basis. Xi'an's city walls during the seventh century AD enclosed approximately 80,000 ha and housed an estimated half a million people; an accomplishment even the most prominent European cities failed to achieve until the 19th century; furthering their historical and present value making them entirely relevant to recent planning paradigm shifts of both the East and Western.

It is perhaps best to follow the example of Santiago Ortuzar, Professor of Urban Planning, School of Architecture
Central & Mayor Universities, Santiago, Chile, who analyzes traditional urban planning in China by separating urban tradition and urban antiquity; two highly integrated aspects of urban morphology as their origins in Eastern planning are different.

Urban antiquities
Human settlements in China are considerably older than those of the West, as neolithic villages in the lower plains of the Yangtze River are approximately 7,500-7,000 years old. Banpo, an early village located on the outskirts of Xi'an, discovered in 1953, may have preceded Xi'an by 1,500 years or more and dates to approximately 5,000 BC. The village, while partially excavated presents considerable evidence of early planning efforts in China as its layout reveals "various land uses (zoning) were allocated and where several activities took place" and further represents "a clear indication of a conscious decision to separate the perilous outside world with a secure internal space" in fashion similar to present towns, cities and global city municipal zoning. Some 45 dwellings and various other structures used for food storage and animal pens compose the site. Further from these structures were work areas, several timber-fired kilns and a cemetery consisting of 250 tombs.  Various types of pottery, bone and timber tools were also recovered from the site; reinforcing the spatial usage patterns derived from the layout, remains and other site data.  The grouping of such objects in archaeological context further reinforces the level of "sophistication both in terms of spatial and human organisation that can only be classified as a settlement inhabited by a cohesive social group composed of urban dwellers" approximately 5,000 years ago.  A second village near Beijing dating to 2,400BC further confirms that similar discoveries such as Banpo "are not isolated examples" of early and intentional urban planning in China.

Chinese settlements, while later than those of the Nile Valley, Indus, Euphrates and Tigris river basins "are undoubtedly some of the worlds first in terms of human evolution and urban character". Ortuzar furthers this statement by indicating that there is "a long urban tradition which stretches far back in time. It has continued to remain uninterrupted for several thousands of years from the very origin of towns until the contemporary city. Few nations can exhibit such continuity over a long period of time".

Urban tradition

Urban tradition is usually intimately related to urban antiquity. However, in the context of China, it has its own set of attributes in relation to urban planning, design and the social realm. China's population is classified as being approximately 55-60% rural, and in contrast to the majority of western countries, rural inhabitants are not thinly distributed over the landscape on individual land tracts.  Rural inhabitants "live grouped together" in hamlets creating an absence of parcel bound dwellings in the countryside. This settlement pattern has existed in China for thousands of years for various purposes including defense from "attacks by bandits, local chieftains and other enemies came together in hamlets. There were practical reasons too, such as the boring of wells to assure themselves of sufficient clean water".  This situation appeared much later in European history for similar reasons.  Rural Chinese live in small scale urban settlements of "about 500 to 700 persons each" with men traveling daily by horseback or bicycle to a nearby plot of land, while women either accompany their husbands to the fields or attend children or the household.  Services, entertainment and social activities are agglomerated in the larger urbanized hamlets that are often planned to service roughly twenty-five surrounding settlements.  The resulting geographic and planned patterns of such settlements respond "to regional criteria of urban distribution, something rarely occurring in other cultures".  The resulting patterns of living in one area and working in another is considered to be a social characteristic that many Chinese peasants have continued as they gradually urbanize into global city regions and other more urbanized and planned environments.  In contrast, European peasants did not begin to urbanize in a similar manner until the advent of modern transportation during the beginning of the Industrial Revolution and arrived in urban areas with little or no urban experience due to the disbursed settlement patterns of the West.  Ortuzar furthers, that the urban tradition in China has been ever-present "as its origins can be traced back to the early ages of development; one which is not necessarily bound to the size of towns, nor to the level or degree of urbanization achieved".

Modern time

Urban planning was given extensive attention post-1949, particularly as part of the First Five Year-Plan. Urban migration stayed below 20%, with city planning primarily supporting urban industries and limiting opportunities for migrating into cities from rural areas. In 1958, The Great Leap Forward shifted the country's focus towards industrialization. Rural people were moved to factory jobs and city dwellings en masse, straining infrastructure. The country recovered slowly. In the Cultural Revolution (1966 – 1976), however, urban residents are encouraged or forced to leave for the countryside. Many historical sites were damaged or destroyed during the "Destroy the Four Olds" movement from 1966 to 1968. Subsequently, massive counter-urbanization known as the Down to the Countryside Movement took place, greatly dampening the process of urbanization in China.

Eventually, in 1979, formal urban planning efforts in China were restored and promoted due to the adoption of reform and open policy, causing consistent urban growth.  The economic boom ushered in by Deng Xiaoping increased funding to major city planning works, including urban revitalization and renewal projects. Architecture of this era was influenced by a re-connection with global designs, including noteworthy examples such as I. M. Pei's the Beijing Xiangshan Hotel.  As understandings of pollution became more comprehensive, urban planning began to focus on creating more environmentally sustainable developments, while also preserving historic aesthetics.  Currently, urban planning in China run on multiple levels of government.  This central planning approach ensures each city follows the national economic plan, exists in a cohesive design with other cities, and is funded by an informed government. Urban planning in China focuses to guide and comprehensively regulate urban construction to ensure the rational development, construction and implementation of the national economic plan that serves as the nation's master planning document.  The central government has established a tiered planning and legal system to guide, implement and regulate urban development and construction in accordance with the national economic plan.

Between 2013 and 2018, Seaside City in Sichuan, China's first fully 'privatised city', was constructed under the aegis of developer Chairman Huang and is home to over 120,000 people.

Planning system

Legislation
The laws in regard to urban and rural planning in the People's Republic of China (mainland) include Urban and Rural Planning Law and its relevant laws, acts and codes.

Administrative system
At the national level, urban and rural planning in mainland China has been mainly administrated by the following departments since 1979:

 (1979 - 1982) State Administration of Urban Construction
 (1982 - 1988) Ministry of Urban-Rural Construction and Environmental Protection
 (1988 - 2008) Ministry of Construction
 (2008 - 2018) Ministry of Housing and Urban-Rural Development (MOHURD)
 (2018 - ) Ministry of Natural Resources (MNR)

At the municipal level, the department concerned is often called "Natural Resources Bureau" or "Planning and Natural Resources Bureau" varying with the city.

Types of plans
In mainland China, the statutory planning system defined in the Urban and Rural Planning Law is as follows:

Old system
 Urban system planning
 National urban system planning
 Provincial urban system planning
 City planning
 City master plan
 including different types of specialized plans
 Detailed plans
 Regulatory plan
 Known as "statutory plan" in Shenzhen; introduced from Hong Kong.
 Site plan
 Town planning
 Town master plan
 In China, a towns is subordinate to a county or a district, and a county or a district is subordinate to a city or a municipality.
 Detailed plans
 Regulatory plan
 Site plan
 Rural planning
 Township plan
 Village plan

Plans which are formulated by urban planning departments but not defined in the Urban and Rural Planning Law, known as non-statutory planning, include strategic plans and renovation plans, etc..

New system

The planning system has been undergoing a reform since the establishment of the Ministry of Natural Resources (MNR) and the shift of urban planning administration from MOHURD to MNR. Since 2019, urban planning managed by the urban planning department, land-use planning managed by the land management administration, as well as other specialized planning of different levels of jurisdictions, have been gradually merged into an integrated "territorial spatial planning" system consisting of five levels and three types. The "five levels" are national, provincial, municipal, county, and township levels in correspondence with the administrative divisions of China. The "three types" include master planning, detailed planning, and specialized planning.

Development control
In practice, urban and rural planning in China is managed through the examination and approval of "one proposal & three permits", namely:

 Written proposal of location (required only for allotted land free of charge in urban areas)
 Land use permit (applied in urban areas)
 Building permit (applied in urban areas)
 Rural construction and planning permit (applied in rural areas)

Criticism
It has been pointed out that the current policy of copying existing, "old", western cities or established Asian cities such as Singapore means missing out on opportunities for radical new thinking regarding city planning that are arising from the unprecedented speed of the current Chinese urbanization. For instance, it has been suggested that putting the entire road network underground can be a viable solution when dense cities are being built "from scratch".

See also
Territorial spatial planning - the current spatial planning system in China
Administrative divisions of China
Ancient Chinese urban planning
Urban Planning Society of China (UPSC)
Urban village (China)
Urbanization in China
Metropolitan regions of China

References

Notes
Current Global Cities World Rankings can be found at the University of Loughborough's Globalisation and World Cities Research Network (GaWC)
Early rural and urban planning philosophies and practice in China are directly related to astronomical observations, the Zouli (Rites of Zhou), concepts of Geomancy, I-Ching and Feng-Shui.